The American Shoal Light is located east of the Saddlebunch Keys, just offshore from Sugarloaf Key, close to Looe Key, in Florida, United States. It was completed in 1880, and first lit on July 15, 1880. The structure was built to the same plan and dimensions as the Fowey Rocks lighthouse, completed in 1878.

History

As early as 1851 plans were made for the erection of a series of great offshore lighthouses to mark the dangerous Florida Reef. These towers, all of skeleton iron construction, to resist hurricanes, were eventually built one at a time over a period of years, that on American Shoal completed in 1880, being the most recently constructed.

American Shoal was built by a Trenton, New Jersey firm and took only 13 months to fabricate, ship, and erect on site.  The site of the lighthouse was 15 miles to the eastward, on the outermost reefs, and was covered with 4 feet of water. Construction continued for about 2 years, and the tower when completed cost about $94,000. The lighthouse was first lighted on the night of July 15, 1880.

American Shoal Light was built in wrought iron on a screw-pile foundation with a platform and a skeletal tower. The tower framework and dwelling are painted brown, while the enclosed circular stair to the lantern is painted white. The original lens was a first-order drum Fresnel lens, producing a flash every 5 seconds. The light was automated in 1963, and a fourth-order lens with solar-powered light was installed, the current (non-operational) light is a VRB-25 aerobeacon.

The lighthouse is listed as number 1015 in the U.S. Coast Guard light list.

In 1990, the U.S. Postal Service issued a 25 cent featuring the American Shoal Light.

The lighthouse was deactivated in 2015.

On May 20, 2016, 24 Cuban refugees boarded the lighthouse.  Elements of the United States Coast Guard repatriated four of the refugees, and interned the other twenty at the Guantanamo Bay Naval Station.

Head keepers
 William Bates (1880 – 1889)
 Henry P. Weatherford (1899 – 1905)
 Alfred A. Berghell (1905 – 1907)
 Arthur C.E. Hamblett (1907 – 1908)
 John Peterson (1908 – 1910)
 William H. Curry (1910 – at least 1915)
 Thomas M. Kelly (1917)
 William H. Pierce (at least 1919)
 Richard C. Roberts (at least 1921 – at least 1936)
 James O. Duncan (1939 – at least 1940)

Availability
On February 1, 2019, it was announced that the lighthouse would be given away freely to any government agencies, educational agencies, non-profit corporations, or any community development organizations who wanted to use it for "educational, park, recreational, cultural or historic preservation purposes."  Eligible entities had to submit an application by April 2, 2019.

In late 2021 the U.S. General Services Administration put out an invitation for bids for the auction of the lighthouse. The lighthouse was sold for $860,000 on May 22, 2022 to an undisclosed bidder.

See also

 List of lighthouses in Florida
 List of lighthouses in the United States

References

Sources
 .
 .

External links

Lighthouses completed in 1880
Lighthouses in Monroe County, Florida
Lighthouses on the National Register of Historic Places in Florida
National Register of Historic Places in Monroe County, Florida
1880 establishments in Florida